The 2009 Japan Open Super Series was a top level badminton competition which was held from September 22, 2009 to September 27, 2009 in Tokyo, Japan. It was the eighth BWF Super Series competition on the 2009 BWF Super Series schedule. The total purse for the event was $200,000.

Men's singles

Seeds
 Lee Chong Wei 
 Chen Jin
 Peter Gade
 Taufik Hidayat
 Sony Dwi Kuncoro
 Park Sung Hwan
 Joachim Persson
 Nguyen Tien Minh

Results

Women's singles

Seeds
 Zhou Mi
 Wang Lin
 Tine Rasmussen
 Wang Yihan 
 Lu Lan
 Xie Xingfang
 Pi Hongyan
 Saina Nehwal

Results

Men's doubles

Seeds
 Markis Kido / Hendra Setiawan
 Koo Kien Keat / Tan Boon Heong
 Jung Jae-sung / Lee Yong-dae
 Mathias Boe / Carsten Mogensen
 Cai Yun / Fu Haifeng
 Lars Paaske / Jonas Rasmussen
 Mohd Zakry Abdul Latif / Mohd Fairuzizuan Mohd Tazari
 Alvent Yulianto Chandra / Hendra Aprida Gunawan

Results

Women's doubles

Seeds
 Chin Eei Hui / Wong Pei Tty
 Ha Jung-Eun / Kim Min-Jung
 Du Jing / Yu Yang
 Shendy Puspa Irawati / Meiliana Jauhari
 Ma Jin / Wang Xiaoli
 Nitya Krishinda Maheswari / Greysia Polii
 Miyuki Maeda / Satoko Suetsuna
 Chen Hsiao-Huan / Cheng Wen-Hsing

Results

Mixed doubles

Seeds
 Lee Yong-Dae / Lee Hyo-jung
 Zheng Bo / Ma Jin
 Nova Widianto / Liliyana Natsir
 He Hanbin / Yu Yang
 Thomas Laybourn / Kamilla Rytter Juhl
 Joachim Fischer Nielsen / Christinna Pedersen
 Diju Valiyaveetil / Jwala Gutta
 Xie Zhongbo / Zhang Yawen

Results

References

External links
Japan Super Series 2009 at tournamentsoftware.com

Japan Open (badminton)
J
Sports competitions in Tokyo
Japan